Laraos District is one of thirty-two districts of the province Huarochirí in Peru.

See also 
 Qiwllaqucha
 Raqray
 Tarapu

References